Lake Manitoba First Nation is located on the Dog Creek 46 Indian reserve in Manitoba. The reserve, which lies on the northeast shore of the south basin of Lake Manitoba, is bordered by the Rural Municipality of Eriksdale and the Rural Municipality of Siglunes. The 2011 Census reported that the reserve had a population of 680 inhabitants.

External links
 Map of Dog Creek 46 at Statcan

References 

 Dog Creek 46 - Lake Manitoba First Nation

Interlake Reserves Tribal Council
Lake Manitoba